The Farinha River is a river of Maranhão state in northeastern Brazil.

See also
List of rivers of Maranhão

References

Brazilian Ministry of Transport

Rivers of Maranhão